Pelmatellus is a genus of ground beetles in the family Carabidae. There are at least 20 described species in Pelmatellus.

Species
These 27 species belong to the genus Pelmatellus:

 Pelmatellus amicorum Delgado & Ruiz-Tapiador, 2020
 Pelmatellus andium Bates, 1891
 Pelmatellus balli Goulet, 1974
 Pelmatellus brachyptera Goulet, 1974
 Pelmatellus caerulescens Moret, 2005
 Pelmatellus columbiana (Reiche, 1843)
 Pelmatellus cuencana Moret, 2001
 Pelmatellus cyanescens Bates, 1882
 Pelmatellus cycnus Moret, 2001
 Pelmatellus espeletiarum Moret, 2001
 Pelmatellus gracilis Moret, 2001
 Pelmatellus inca Moret, 2001
 Pelmatellus infuscata Goulet, 1974
 Pelmatellus laticlavia Moret, 2001
 Pelmatellus leucopus (Bates, 1882)
 Pelmatellus lojana Moret, 2001
 Pelmatellus martinezi Moret, 2001
 Pelmatellus nigrita (Motschulsky, 1866)
 Pelmatellus nitescens Bates, 1882
 Pelmatellus nubicola Goulet, 1974
 Pelmatellus obesa Moret, 2001
 Pelmatellus obtusa Bates, 1882
 Pelmatellus polylepis Moret, 2001
 Pelmatellus rotundicollis Goulet, 1974
 Pelmatellus stenolophoides Bates, 1882
 Pelmatellus variipes Bates, 1891
 Pelmatellus vexator Bates, 1882

References

Harpalinae
Carabidae genera